William Ker (1852–1925) was a Scottish footballer, who played in the first ever international football match for Scotland against England in 1872.

Ker also played for Scotland against England the following year. He played for Scottish amateur club Queen's Park. His younger brother, George Ker, was also a Scotland international footballer.

He was the son of the renowned physicist Rev John Kerr, discoverer of the Kerr effect and revised the spelling of his surname as a young man to Ker. He emigrated to Canada in 1873 and later lived in Pennsylvania, Washington and finally Washington, D.C., where he died.

References

External links

1852 births
1925 deaths
Scottish footballers
Scotland international footballers
Queen's Park F.C. players
Scottish expatriate sportspeople in Canada
Scottish expatriate sportspeople in the United States
Association football fullbacks
Footballers from Edinburgh